In Islam,  refers to the temporal world and its earthly concerns and possessions, as opposed to the hereafter (ʾākhirah). In the Qur'an, dunyā and ākhira are sometimes used dichotomously, other times complementarily. Islam does not a priori dismiss the world as "evil". Instead, this world is defined as "the field of ākhira" and the place of examination. In ancient Caucasian religions such as Mari, Dunya or Tunya refers to the God of the World. Two Qur'anic ayat (verses) show that dunyā and ākhira are not considered as alternatives to each other per se:

 "Ordain for us the good in this world [al-dunyā] and in the hereafter [al-ākhira]." (Surah Al A'râf 7:156)
 "You are my friend in this world [al-dunyā] and the next [al-ākhira]." (Surah Yusuf 12:101)

What the Qur'an condemns is too much attention to the earthly life at the cost of forgetting the eternal life. For this purpose, Muslims are encouraged in the Qur'an 47:24 to ponder the verses of the Qur'an itself, and to do their best to not get too attached to this temporal existence and its trappings. In Islam, dunyā is a test; success and failure lead to paradise and hell, respectively.

Modern usage
The term   is originally an Arabic word that derives from the root d-n-w ( 'to bring near'). In that sense, dunya is "what is brought near". The term has spread to many other languages, particularly those with large groups of Muslim speakers. For example;
 /  in Egyptian Arabic
  in Turkish
  in Azerbaijani
  in Kurdish
  in Hindi, Marathi and Nepali
  in Bengali and Assamese
  in Punjabi
  in Gujarati
  in Urdu, Sindhi and Punjabi
  in Persian
  in Modern Greek
  in Hausa
  in Adamawa Fulfulde
  in Wakhi,
  in Malay, Swahili and Indonesian
  in Javanese
  in Turkmen
  in Uzbek
  in Somali
  in Udmurt

References

External links 
 Religious discussion of Dunya

Arabic words and phrases
Islamic terminology
Islamic philosophy